The Chicago mayoral election of 1951 was first the primary in February 1951, which was followed by the general on April 3, 1951. The election saw Democrat Martin H. Kennelly being reelected for a second term, defeating Republican Robert L. Hunter by a double-digit margin.

Background
The state of Illinois in 1944 had passed legislation which aimed to tighten the state's previously overly-lax voter registration laws. One measure of this was that, after the November elections in presidential election years, county clerks would begin the process canceling the registration of those who had not voted in the previous four years. There were a number of other measures which would result in the cancellation of voter registrations.

Nominations

Democratic primary

Republican primary

General election

Hunter attacked Kennelly, characterizing him as a "do-nothing mayor". He called for the defeat of not just Kenelly, but of the political machine that had put him forth for mayor. He argued that big-city Democratic machines needed to be defeated in order to save the country.

The Chicago Tribune and Hunter's candidacy were initially closely linked. Hunter would meet twice or thrice weekly with the newspaper's editor Don Maxwell. He effectively adopted their editorials as his own campaign platform. For instance, he adopted the Tribune's stance against municipal ownership of the water supply. The Tribune, and therefore Hunter, blamed the local Democratic Party for having helped President Harry S. Truman win reelection. They therefore litigated what they regarded to have been Truman's misdeeds as presidents, including extending New Deal policies and entering the nation into the Korean War. Local Republicans campaigning for Hunter, including Senator Everett Dirksen, regularly focused their campaign on national and international issues such as the Cold War and the Korean War. They also accused Kennelly of "dodging" national issues. Illinois' Democratic Governor Adlai Stevenson II derided the Republicans' national-politics focused approach to a local election as, "a political absurdity". The Tribune weakened its support of Hunter after he attacked Commonwealth Edison's new contract with the city under Kennelly, since the chairman of the board for Commonwealth Edison was also on Tribune Company board of directors.

Hunter campaigned vigorously. The election generated very little interest, contributing to its low turnout. Contributing to voter apathy may have been findings by the United States Senate Special Committee to Investigate Crime in Interstate Commerce that shined a negative light on the underworld of Chicago politics. Findings by this committee also harmed Kennelly, as he was perceived by the electorate to have done little to stamp out organized crime in the city. However, Hunter also failed to demonstrate to voters ability on his part to solve the crime issue in the city, and refused to take any strong stance against elements of the Republican party that were allied with gangsters Kennelly had, by 1951, seen a loss of support among African American electorate that had strongly supported him four years earlier.

Results
Kenelly won 34 wards. Hunter defeated Kenelly in sixteen wards, more than double the number of wards that Kennelly had lost four years before.

References

Mayoral elections in Chicago
Chicago
Chicago
20th century in Chicago
1950s in Chicago